The 2012 Texas Rangers season was the 52nd season in the overall history of the franchise and the 41st since the team relocated to Arlington, Texas. The Rangers entered the season as the two-time defending champions of the American League and the AL West. They led the division for most of the season and had a 13-game lead on June 30, but faltered down the stretch. They finished 93-69, but were swept in the last series of the season by the Oakland Athletics and wound up second to the Athletics in the division. They then lost to the Baltimore Orioles in the Wild Card Game and were eliminated from the playoffs.

Offseason

Transactions
October 31, 2011: The team exercised its club options on Colby Lewis and Yoshinori Tateyama, while also announcing that the entire coaching staff would return for 2012.
November 2, 2011: RHP Darren O'Day was claimed on waivers by the Baltimore Orioles
November 21, 2011: The club signed RHP Joe Nathan to a two-year $14.5 million deal with an option for a third year. He will be the team's closer and subsequently bump RHP Neftalí Feliz into the starting rotation. Nathan leaves the Minnesota Twins after becoming the all-time saves leader for the franchise over nine seasons with the club.
December 1, 2011: Taylor Teagarden was traded to the Baltimore Orioles for minor league RHP Randy Henry and a player to be named later. On December 8, 2011, the player was identified as minor league 2B Greg Miclat.
December 19, 2011: The team won the negotiating rights to Japanese RHP Yu Darvish for $51.7 million through the Posting system. The Rangers will have 30 days to negotiate a contract with Darvish, if no agreement is reached, then the posting fee is returned to the club and Darvish will return to the Hokkaido Nippon-Ham Fighters for the 2012 season.
December 21, 2011: C Luis Martinez acquired from the San Diego Padres for minor league RHP Ryan Kelly. Martinez will be put on the 40-man roster.
January 5, 2012: The Rangers traded infielder Chad Tracy to the Colorado Rockies in exchange for RHP Greg Reynolds. Reynolds was assigned to Triple A Round Rock.
January 18, 2012: The Rangers and Japanese RHP Yu Darvish agreed on a six-year, $60 million contract. The contract was signed 15 minutes before a 4:00pm CST deadline. Yu was formally introduced to the organization with a press conference on January 20.

Roster

Season standings

American League West

American League Wild Card

Record vs. opponents

Game log 

|- style="text-align:center; style="background-color:#bbffbb;"
| 1 || April 6 || White Sox || 3–2 || Lewis (1–0) || Danks (0–1) || Nathan (1) || 49,085 || 1–0
|- style="text-align:center; style="background-color:#ffbbbb;"
| 2 || April 7 || White Sox || 4–3 || Thornton (1–0) || Nathan (0–1) || Santiago (1) || 47,867 || 1–1
|- style="text-align:center; style="background-color:#bbffbb;"
| 3 || April 8 || White Sox || 5–0 || Harrison (1–0) || Floyd (0–1) || || 45,368 || 2–1
|- style="text-align:center; style="background-color:#bbffbb;"
| 4 || April 9 || Mariners || 11–5 || Darvish (1–0) || Noesí (0–1)|| || 43,002 || 3–1
|- style="text-align:center; style="background-color:#bbffbb;"
| 5 || April 10 || Mariners || 1–0 || Feliz (1–0) || Beavan (0–1)|| Nathan (2) || 25,753 || 4–1
|- style="text-align:center; style="background-color:#ffbbbb;"
| 6 || April 11 || Mariners || 4–3 || Luetge (1–0) || Nathan (0–2) || League (3) || 32,342 || 4–2
|- style="text-align:center; style="background-color:#bbffbb;"
| 7 || April 12 || Mariners || 5–3 || Holland (1–0) || Vargas (1–1) || Adams (1) || 31,513 || 5–2
|- style="text-align:center; style="background-color:#bbffbb;"
| 8 || April 13 || @ Twins || 4–1 || Harrison (2–0) || Swarzak (0–2)|| Ogando (1) || 31,400 || 6–2
|- style="text-align:center; style="background-color:#bbffbb;"
| 9 || April 14 || @ Twins || 6–2 || Ross (1–0) || Duensing (0–1) || || 35,854 || 7–2
|- style="text-align:center; style="background-color:#bbffbb;"
| 10 || April 15 || @ Twins || 4–3 || Ross (2–0) || Perkins (0–1) || Nathan (3) || 32,093 || 8–2
|- style="text-align:center; style="background-color:#bbffbb;"
| 11 || April 17 || @ Red Sox || 18–3 || Lewis (2–0) || Lester (0–2) || || 38,229 || 9–2
|- style="text-align:center; style="background-color:#bbffbb;"
| 12 || April 18 || @ Red Sox || 6–3 || Holland (2–0) || Beckett (1–2) || || 37,967 || 10–2
|- style="text-align:center; style="background-color:#bbffbb;"
| 13 || April 19 || @ Tigers || 10–3 ||Darvish (2–0) ||Wilk (0-2) || || 30,029 || 11-2
|- style="text-align:center; style="background-color:#bbbbbb;"
|  || April 20 || @ Tigers || colspan=7| Postponed (rain); Makeup: April 21 as part of a doubleheader
|- style="text-align:center; style="background-color:#bbffbb;"
| 14 || April 21 || @ Tigers || 10–4 || Harrison (3–0) || Porcello (1–1) || || 41,427 || 12–2
|- style="text-align:center; style="background-color:#ffbbbb;"
| 15 || April 21 || @ Tigers || 3–2 || Verlander (2–1) || Feliz (1–1) || Valverde (4) || 35,001 || 12–3
|- style="text-align:center; style="background-color:#bbffbb;"
| 16 || April 22 || @ Tigers || 3–2 (11) || Ross (3–0) || Weber (0–1) || Nathan (4) || 36,255 || 13–3
|- style="text-align:center; style="background-color:#ffbbbb;"
| 17 || April 23 || Yankees || 7–4 || Sabathia (2–0) || Holland (2–1) || Rivera (4) || 48,234 || 13–4
|- style="text-align:center; style="background-color:#bbffbb;"
| 18 || April 24 || Yankees || 2–0 || Darvish (3–0) || Kuroda (1–3)|| Nathan (5) || 47,085|| 14–4
|- style="text-align:center; style="background-color:#bbffbb;"
| 19 || April 25 || Yankees || 7–3 || Ross (4–0) || Hughes (1–3) || || 47,942 || 15–4
|- style="text-align:center; style="background-color:#ffbbbb;"
| 20 || April 27 || Rays || 8–4 || Shields (4–0) || Harrison (3–1) || || 47,496 || 15–5
|- style="text-align:center; style="background-color:#bbffbb;"
| 21 || April 28 || Rays || 7–2 || Lewis (3–0) || Niemann (1–3) || || 49,197 || 16–5
|- style="text-align:center; style="background-color:#ffbbbb;"
| 22 || April 29 || Rays || 5–2 || Price (4–1) || Holland (2–2) || Rodney (7) || 43,475 || 16–6
|- style="text-align:center; style="background-color:#bbffbb;"
| 23 || April 30 || @ Blue Jays || 4–1 || Darvish (4–0) || Drabek (2–2) || Nathan (6) || 21,945 || 17–6
|-

|- style="text-align:center; style="background-color:#ffbbbb;"
| 24 || May 1 || @ Blue Jays || 8–7 || Cordero (1–1) || Adams (0–1) || || 18,774 || 17–7
|- style="text-align:center; style="background-color:#ffbbbb;"
| 25 || May 2 || @ Blue Jays || 11–5 || Romero (4–0) || Harrison (3–2) || || 25,123 || 17–8 
|- style="text-align:center; style="background-color:#ffbbbb;"
| 26 || May 4 || @ Indians || 6–3 || Gómez (2–1) || Lewis (3–1) || Perez (10) || 16,147 || 17–9
|- style="text-align:center; style="background-color:#bbffbb;"
| 27 || May 5 || @ Indians || 5–2 (11) || Ogando (1–0) || Smith (1–1) || Nathan (7) || 21,307 || 18–9
|- style="text-align:center; style="background-color:#ffbbbb;"
| 28 || May 6 || @ Indians || 4–2 || Jiménez (3–2) || Darvish (4–1) || Perez (11) || 18,171 || 18–10
|- style="text-align:center; style="background-color:#bbffbb;"
| 29 || May 7 || @ Orioles || 14–3 || Harrison (4–2) || Matusz (1–4) || || 11,938 || 19–10
|- style="text-align:center; style="background-color:#bbffbb;"
| 30 || May 8 || @ Orioles || 10–3 || Feliz (2–1) || Arrieta (2–3) || || 11,263 || 20–10
|- style="text-align:center; style="background-color:#bbbbbb;"
|  || May 9 || @ Orioles || colspan=6| Postponed (rain); Makeup: May 10 as part of a doubleheader
|- style="text-align:center; style="background-color:#ffbbbb;"
| 31 || May 10 || @ Orioles || 6–5 || Chen (3–0) || Lewis (3–2) || Johnson (9) || || 20–11
|- style="text-align:center; style="background-color:#bbffbb;"
| 32 || May 10 || @ Orioles || 7–3 || Holland (3–2) || Hunter (2–2) || || 19,250 || 21–11
|- style="text-align:center; style="background-color:#bbffbb;"
| 33 || May 11 || Angels || 10–3 || Darvish (5–1) || Wilson (4–3) || || 48,201 || 22–11
|- style="text-align:center; style="background-color:#ffbbbb;"
| 34 || May 12 || Angels || 4–2 || Carpenter (1–1) || Harrison (4–3) || Downs (3) || 47,699 || 22–12
|- style="text-align:center; style="background-color:#bbffbb;"
| 35 || May 13 || Angels || 13–6 || Feliz (3–1) || Weaver (5–1) || || 46,669 || 23–12
|- style="text-align:center; style="background-color:#ffbbbb;"
| 36 || May 14 || Royals || 3–1 || Chen (2–4) || Feldman (0–1) || Broxton (8) || 38,702 || 23–13
|- style="text-align:center; style="background-color:#ffbbbb;"
| 37 || May 15 || Royals || 7–4 || Mazzaro (1–0) || Lewis (3–3) || || 37,210 || 23–14
|- style="text-align:center; style="background-color:#bbffbb;"
| 38 || May 16 || Athletics || 4–1 || Darvish (6–1) || Milone (5–3) || Nathan (8) || 46,370 || 24–14
|- style="text-align:center; style="background-color:#ffbbbb;"
| 39 || May 17 || Athletics || 5–4 (10) || Cook (1–0) || Adams (0–2) || Fuentes (3) || 47,182 || 24–15
|- style="text-align:center; style="background-color:#bbffbb;"
| 40 || May 18 || @ Astros || 4–1 || Ross (5–0) || Rodríguez (3–4) || Nathan (9) || 34,715 || 25–15
|- style="text-align:center; style="background-color:#ffbbbb;"
| 41 || May 19 || @ Astros || 6–5 || Harrell (3–3) || Holland (3–3) || Myers (10) || 42,673 || 25–16
|- style="text-align:center; style="background-color:#bbffbb;"
| 42 || May 20 || @ Astros || 6–1 || Lewis (4–3) || Lyles (0–1) || || 35,873 || 26–16
|- style="text-align:center; style="background-color:#ffbbbb;"
| 43 || May 21 || @ Mariners || 6–1 || Hernández (4–3) || Darvish (6–2) || || 18,672 || 26–17
|- style="text-align:center; style="background-color:#bbffbb;"
| 44 || May 22 || @ Mariners || 3–1 || Harrison (5–3) || Noesí (2–5) || Nathan (10) || 15,604 || 27–17
|- style="text-align:center; style="background-color:#ffbbbb;"
| 45 || May 23 || @ Mariners || 5–3 || Millwood (3–4) || Feldman (0–2) || League (9) || 23,097 || 27–18
|- style="text-align:center; style="background-color:#bbffbb;"
| 46 || May 25 || Blue Jays || 14–3 || Holland (4–3) || Morrow (5–3) || || 46,789 || 28–18
|- style="text-align:center; style="background-color:#bbffbb;"
| 47 || May 26 || Blue Jays || 8–7 (13) || Tateyama (1–0) || Frasor (0–1) || || 47,430 || 29–18
|- style="text-align:center; style="background-color:#bbffbb;"
| 48 || May 27 || Blue Jays || 12–6 || Darvish (7–2) || Drabek (4–5) || || 46,637 || 30–18
|- style="text-align:center; style="background-color:#bbffbb;"
| 49 || May 28 || Mariners || 4–2 || Harrison (6–3) || Delabar (1–1) || Nathan (11) || 41,384 || 31–18
|- style="text-align:center; style="background-color:#ffbbbb;"
| 50 || May 29 || Mariners || 10–3 || Vargas (6–4) || Feldman (0–3) || || 34,531 || 31–19
|- style="text-align:center; style="background-color:#ffbbbb;"
| 51 || May 30 || Mariners || 21–8 || Beavan (3–4) || Holland (4–4) || Iwakuma (1) || 43,580 || 31-20
|-

|- style="text-align:center; style="background-color:#ffbbbb;"
| 52 || June 1 || @ Angels || 4–2 || Williams (6–2) || Lewis (4–4) || Frieri (3) || 40,080 || 31–21
|- style="text-align:center; style="background-color:#ffbbbb;"
| 53 || June 2 || @ Angels || 3–2 || Cassevah (1–0) || Darvish (7–3) || Frieri (4) || 44,227 || 31–22
|- style="text-align:center; style="background-color:#bbffbb;"
| 54 || June 3 || @ Angels || 7–3 || Harrison (7–3) || Haren (3–6) || || 42,465 || 32–22
|- style="text-align:center; style="background-color:#ffbbbb;"
| 55 || June 4 || @ Athletics || 12–1 || Parker (2–2) || Feldman (0–4) || || 10,120 || 32–23
|- style="text-align:center; style="background-color:#bbffbb;"
| 56 || June 5 || @ Athletics || 6–3 || Holland (5–4) || Blackley (0–1) || Nathan (12) || 11,861 || 33–23
|- style="text-align:center; style="background-color:#ffbbbb;"
| 57 || June 6 || @ Athletics || 2–0 || Colón (5–6) || Lewis (4–5) || Fuentes (5) || 15,044 || 33–24
|- style="text-align:center; style="background-color:#ffbbbb;"
| 58 || June 7 || @ Athletics || 7–1 || McCarthy (5–3) || Darvish (7–4) || || 14,779 || 33–25
|- style="text-align:center; style="background-color:#bbffbb;"
| 59 || June 8 || @ Giants || 5–0 || Harrison (8–3) || Zito (5–3) || || 41,163 || 34–25
|- style="text-align:center; style="background-color:#ffbbbb;"
| 60 || June 9 || @ Giants || 5–2 || Vogelsong (5–2) || Feldman (0–5) || Casilla (16) || 41,704 || 34–26
|- style="text-align:center; style="background-color:#bbffbb;"
| 61 || June 10 || @ Giants || 5–0 || Ross (6–0) || Lincecum (2–7) || || 42,418 || 35–26
|- style="text-align:center; style="background-color:#bbffbb;"
| 62 || June 12 || Diamondbacks || 9–1 || Lewis (5–5) || Kennedy (5–6) || || 39,140 || 36–26
|- style="text-align:center; style="background-color:#bbffbb;"
| 63 || June 13 || Diamondbacks || 1–0 || Adams (1–2) || Miley (7–3) || Nathan (13) || 45,866 || 37–26
|- style="text-align:center; style="background-color:#ffbbbb;"
| 64 || June 14 || Diamondbacks || 11–3 || Hudson (3–1) || Feldman (0–6) || || 40,855 || 37–27
|- style="text-align:center; style="background-color:#bbffbb;"
| 65 || June 15 || Astros || 6–2 || Darvish (8–4) || Lyles (1–3) || || 47,430 || 38–27
|- style="text-align:center; style="background-color:#bbffbb;"
| 66 || June 16 || Astros || 8–3 || Grimm (1–0) || Harrell (6–5) || || 48,288 || 39–27
|- style="text-align:center; style="background-color:#bbffbb;"
| 67 || June 17 || Astros || 9–3 || Lewis (6–5) || Rodriguez (1–7) || || 46,320 || 40–27
|- style="text-align:center; style="background-color:#bbffbb;"
| 68 || June 18 || @ Padres || 2–1 || Harrison (9–3) || Marquis (3–6) || Nathan (14) || 29,315 || 41–27
|- style="text-align:center; style="background-color:#bbffbb;"
| 69 || June 19 || @ Padres || 7–3 || Feldman (1–6) || Vólquez (3–7) || || 25,889 || 42–27
|- style="text-align:center; style="background-color:#bbffbb;"
| 70 || June 20 || @ Padres || 4–2 || Darvish (9–4) || Thayer (0–2) || Nathan (15) || 23,942 || 43–27
|- style="text-align:center; style="background-color:#bbffbb;"
| 71 || June 22 || Rockies || 4–1 || Oswalt (1–0) || Friedrich (4–4) || Nathan (16) || 46,964 || 44–27
|- style="text-align:center; style="background-color:#ffbbbb;"
| 72 || June 23 || Rockies || 11–7 || Brothers (3–2) || Lewis (6–6) || || 42,516 || 44–28
|- style="text-align:center; style="background-color:#bbffbb;"
| 73 || June 24 || Rockies || 4–2 || Harrison (10–3) || White (2–6) || || 45,407 || 45–28
|- style="text-align:center; style="background-color:#ffbbbb;"
| 74 || June 25 || Tigers || 8–2 || Porcello (5–5) || Grimm (1–1) || || 36,920 || 45–29
|- style="text-align:center; style="background-color:#bbffbb;"
| 75 || June 26 || Tigers || 7–5 || Darvish (10–4) || Smyly (2–3) || Nathan (17) || 39,561 || 46–29
|- style="text-align:center; style="background-color:#bbffbb;"
| 76 || June 27 || Tigers || 13–9 || Oswalt (2–0) || Fister (1–5) || || 43,379 || 47–29
|- style="text-align:center; style="background-color:#bbffbb;"
| 77 || June 28 || Athletics || 7–6 || Feldman (2–6) || Ross (2–8) || Nathan (18) || 33,927 || 48–29
|- style="text-align:center; style="background-color:#bbffbb;"
| 78 || June 29 || Athletics || 4–3 || Harrison (11–3) || Balfour (1–2) || Scheppers (1) || 46,013 || 49–29
|- style="text-align:center; style="background-color:#bbffbb;"
| 79 || June 30 || Athletics || 7–2 || Pérez (1–0) || Milone (8–6) || || 46,711 || 50–29
|-

|- style="text-align:center; style="background-color:#ffbbbb;"
| 80 || July 1 || Athletics || 3–1 || Blackley (2–2) || Darvish (10–5) || Cook (7) || 45,741 || 50–30
|- style="text-align:center; style="background-color:#ffbbbb;"
| 81 || July 3 || @ White Sox || 19–2 || Sale (10–2) || Oswalt (2–1) || || 30,183 || 50–31
|- style="text-align:center; style="background-color:#ffbbbb;"
| 82 || July 4 || @ White Sox || 5–4 (10) || Reed (2–1) || Adams (1–3) || || 30,271 || 50–32
|- style="text-align:center; style="background-color:#ffbbbb;"
| 83 || July 5 || @ White Sox || 2–1 || Quintana (4–1) || Harrison (11–4) || Reed (12) || 21,288 || 50–33
|- style="text-align:center; style="background-color:#ffbbbb;"
| 84 || July 6 || Twins || 5–1 || Liriano (3–7) || Pérez (1–1) || || 47,240 || 50–34
|- style="text-align:center; style="background-color:#bbffbb;"
| 85 || July 7 || Twins || 4–3 (10) || Nathan (1–2) || Waldrop (0–1) || || 47,067 || 51–34
|- style="text-align:center; style="background-color:#bbffbb;"
| 86 || July 8 || Twins || 4–3 (13) || Feldman (3–6) || Burnett (2–2) || || 43,268 || 52–34
|- style="text-align:center; style="background-color:#bbffbb;"
| 87 || July 13 || @ Mariners || 3–2 || Holland (6–4) || Millwood (3–7) || Nathan (19) || 23,721 || 53–34
|- style="text-align:center; style="background-color:#ffbbbb;"
| 88 || July 14 || @ Mariners || 7–0 || Hernández (7–5) || Darvish (10–6) || || 29,951 || 53–35
|- style="text-align:center; style="background-color:#bbffbb;"
| 89 || July 15 || @ Mariners || 4–0 || Harrison (12–4) || Iwakuma (1–2) || || 27,378 || 54–35
|- style="text-align:center; style="background-color:#bbffbb;"
| 90 || July 17 || @ Athletics || 6–1 || Oswalt (3–1) || Colón (6–8) || || 15,115 || 55–35
|- style="text-align:center; style="background-color:#ffbbbb;"
| 91 || July 18 || @ Athletics || 4–3 || Cook (3–2) || Kirkman (0–1) || || 20,249 || 55–36
|- style="text-align:center; style="background-color:#ffbbbb;"
| 92 || July 20 || @ Angels || 6–1 || Weaver (12–1) || Holland (6–5) || || 43,936 || 55–37
|- style="text-align:center; style="background-color:#bbffbb;"
| 93 || July 21 || @ Angels || 9–2 || Darvish (11–6) || Santana (4–10) || || 39,086 || 56–37
|- style="text-align:center; style="background-color:#ffbbbb;"
| 94 || July 22 || @ Angels || 7–4 || Haren (7–8) || Harrison (12–5) || || 42,160 || 56–38
|- style="text-align:center; style="background-color:#bbffbb;"
| 95 || July 23 || Red Sox || 9–1 || Feldman (4–6) || Doubront (10–5) || || 44,132 || 57–38
|- style="text-align:center; style="background-color:#ffbbbb;"
| 96 || July 24 || Red Sox || 2–1 || Padilla (4–0) || Nathan (1–3) || Aceves (21) || 41,237 || 57–39
|- style="text-align:center; style="background-color:#bbffbb;"
| 97 || July 25 || Red Sox || 5–3 || Holland (7–5) || Beckett (5–9) || Nathan (20) || 44,104 || 58–39
|- style="text-align:center; style="background-color:#ffbbbb;"
| 98 || July 27 || White Sox || 9–5 || Sale (12–3) || Darvish (11–7) || || 47,638 || 58–40
|- style="text-align:center; style="background-color:#ffbbbb;"
| 99 || July 28 || White Sox || 5–2 || Humber (5–5) || Harrison (12–6) || || 47,580 || 58–41
|- style="text-align:center; style="background-color:#bbffbb;"
| 100 || July 29 || White Sox || 2–0 || Feldman (5–6) || Floyd (8–9) || Nathan (21) || 46,744 || 59–41
|- style="text-align:center; style="background-color:#ffbbbb;"
| 101 || July 30 || Angels || 15–8 || Santana (5–10) || Oswalt (3–2) || Williams (1) || 36,111 || 59–42
|- style="text-align:center; style="background-color:#ffbbbb;"
| 102 || July 31 || Angels || 6–2 || Weaver (14–1) || Holland (7–6) || || 34,918 || 59–43
|-

|- style="text-align:center; style="background-color:#bbffbb;"
| 103 || August 1 || Angels || 11–10 (10) || Nathan (2–3) || Isringhausen (3–1) || || 42,832 || 60–43
|- style="text-align:center; style="background-color:#bbffbb;"
| 104 || August 2 || Angels || 15–9 || Oswalt (4–2) || Carpenter (1–2) || || 40,281 || 61–43
|- style="text-align:center; style="background-color:#bbffbb;"
| 105 || August 3 || @ Royals || 5–3 || Harrison (13–6) || Guthrie (3–12) || Ogando (2) || 26,889 || 62–43
|- style="text-align:center; style="background-color:#bbffbb;"
| 106 || August 4 || @ Royals || 4–2 || Feldman (6–6) || Smith (2–4) || Ogando (3) || 28,724 || 63–43
|- style="text-align:center; style="background-color:#ffbbbb;"
| 107 || August 5 || @ Royals || 7–6 (10) || Holland (5–3) || Kirkman (0–2) || || 22,007 || 63–44
|- style="text-align:center; style="background-color:#ffbbbb;"
| 108 || August 6 || @ Red Sox || 9–2 || Cook (3–5) || Darvish (11–8) || || 37,316 || 63–45
|- style="text-align:center; style="background-color:#bbffbb;"
| 109 || August 7 || @ Red Sox || 6–3 || Dempster (6–5) || Lester (5–10) || Nathan (22) || 38,416 || 64–45
|- style="text-align:center; style="background-color:#bbffbb;"
| 110 || August 8 || @ Red Sox || 10–9 || Ogando (2–0) || Mortensen (1–1) || Nathan (23) || 37,716 || 65–45
|- style="text-align:center; style="background-color:#ffbbbb;"
| 111 || August 10 || Tigers || 6–2 || Scherzer (11–6) || Feldman (6–7) || || 47,255 || 65–46
|- style="text-align:center; style="background-color:#bbffbb;"
| 112 || August 11 || Tigers || 2–1 || Adams (2–3) || Villarreal (3–3) || || 48,303 || 66–46
|- style="text-align:center; style="background-color:#bbffbb;"
| 113 || August 12 || Tigers || 8–3 || Darvish (12–8) || Porcello (9–7) || || 45,752 || 67–46
|- style="text-align:center; style="background-color:#ffbbbb;"
| 114 || August 13 || @ Yankees || 8–2 || Phelps (3–3) || Dempster (6–6) || Lowe (1) || 45,676 || 67–47
|- style="text-align:center; style="background-color:#ffbbbb;"
| 115 || August 14 || @ Yankees || 3–0 || Kuroda (11–8) || Harrison (13–7) || || 44,533 || 67–48
|- style="text-align:center; style="background-color:#ffbbbb;"
| 116 || August 15 || @ Yankees || 3–2 || García (7–5) || Feldman (6–8) || Soriano (29) || 45,921 || 67–49
|- style="text-align:center; style="background-color:#bbffbb;"
| 117 || August 16 || @ Yankees || 10–6 || Scheppers (1–0) || Logan (4–1) || || 47,645 || 68–49
|- style="text-align:center; style="background-color:#ffbbbb;"
| 118 || August 17 || @ Blue Jays || 3–2 || Happ (9–10) || Darvish (12–9) || Janssen (16) || 26,816 || 68–50
|- style="text-align:center; style="background-color:#bbffbb;"
| 119 || August 18 || @ Blue Jays || 2–1 || Kirkman (1–2) || Villanueva (6–3) || Nathan (24) || 30,033 || 69–50
|- style="text-align:center; style="background-color:#bbffbb;"
| 120 || August 19 || @ Blue Jays || 11–2 || Harrison (14–7) || Álvarez (7–11) || || 35,701 || 70–50
|- style="text-align:center; style="background-color:#bbffbb;"
| 121 || August 20 || Orioles || 5–1 || Dempster (7–6) || González (5–3) || || 36,257 || 71–50
|- style="text-align:center; style="background-color:#ffbbbb;"
| 122 || August 21 || Orioles || 5–3 || Tillman (6–2) || Feldman (6–9) || Johnson (38) || 32,146 || 71–51
|- style="text-align:center; style="background-color:#bbffbb;"
| 123 || August 22 || Orioles || 12–3 || Holland (8–6) || Hunter (4–8) || || 40,714 || 72–51
|- style="text-align:center; style="background-color:#bbffbb;"
| 124 || August 23 || Twins || 10–6 || Adams (3–3) || Burton (1–1) || Nathan (25) || 33,762 || 73–51
|- style="text-align:center; style="background-color:#bbffbb;"
| 125 || August 24 || Twins || 8–0 || Harrison (15–7) || Deduno (4–2) || || 45,823 || 74–51
|- style="text-align:center; style="background-color:#bbffbb;"
| 126 || August 25 || Twins || 9–3 || Dempster (8–6) || Duensing (3–9) || || 44,215 || 75–51
|- style="text-align:center; style="background-color:#ffbbbb;"
| 127 || August 26 || Twins || 6–5 || De Vries (3–5) || Feldman (6–10) || Perkins (8) || 37,785 || 75–52
|- style="text-align:center; style="background-color:#bbffbb;"
| 128 || August 27 || Rays || 6–5 || Holland (9–6) || Price (16–5) || Nathan (26) || 29,453 || 76–52
|- style="text-align:center; style="background-color:#bbffbb;"
| 129 || August 28 || Rays || 1–0 || Darvish (13–9) || Shields (12–8) || Nathan (27) || 30,700 || 77–52
|- style="text-align:center; style="background-color:#ffbbbb;"
| 130 || August 29 || Rays || 8–4 || McGee (5–2) || Harrison (15–8) || || 36,176 || 77–53
|- style="text-align:center; style="background-color:#bbffbb;"
| 131 || August 31 || @ Indians || 5–3 || Dempster (9–6) || Jiménez (9–14) || Nathan (28) || 16,700 || 78–53
|-

|- style="text-align:center; style="background-color:#ffbbbb;"
| 132 || September 1 || @ Indians || 4–3 || Gómez (5–7) || Feldman (6–11) || Pestano (1) || 17,218 || 78–54
|- style="text-align:center; style="background-color:#bbffbb;"
| 133 || September 2 || @ Indians || 8–3 || Holland (10–6) || McAllister (5–6) || || 19,474 || 79–54
|- style="text-align:center; style="background-color:#bbffbb;"
| 134 || September 3 || @ Royals || 8–4 || Darvish (14–9) || Chen (10–11) || || 22,207 || 80–54
|- style="text-align:center; style="background-color:#ffbbbb;"
| 135 || September 4 || @ Royals || 6–3 || Guthrie (7–12) || Harrison (15–9) || Holland (11) || 12,462 || 80–55
|- style="text-align:center; style="background-color:#bbffbb;"
| 136 || September 5 || @ Royals || 7–6 || Dempster (10–6) || Teaford (1–4) || Nathan (29) || 13,354 || 81–55
|- style="text-align:center; style="background-color:#bbffbb;"
| 137 || September 6 || @ Royals || 5–4 (10) || Adams (4–3) || Holland (6–4) || Nathan (30) || 15,332 || 82–55
|- style="text-align:center; style="background-color:#ffbbbb;"
| 138 || September 7 || @ Rays || 3–1 (11) || Davis (3–0) || Lowe (0–1) || || 19,545 || 82–56
|- style="text-align:center; style="background-color:#bbffbb;"
| 139 || September 8 || @ Rays || 4–2 (10) || Adams (5–3) || Farnsworth (1–4) || Nathan (31) || 18,702 || 83–56
|- style="text-align:center; style="background-color:#ffbbbb;"
| 140 || September 9 || @ Rays || 6–0 || Shields (14–8) || Oswalt (4–3) || || 20,522 || 83–57
|- style="text-align:center; style="background-color:#bbffbb;"
| 141 || September 11 || Indians || 6–4 || Harrison (16–9) || Jiménez (9–16) || Nathan (32) || 34,765 || 84–57
|- style="text-align:center; style="background-color:#bbffbb;"
| 142 || September 12 || Indians || 5–2 || Dempster (11–6) || Gómez (5–8) || Nathan (33) || 36,001 || 85–57
|- style="text-align:center; style="background-color:#ffbbbb;"
| 143 || September 13 || Indians || 5–4 || Maine (2–1) || Nathan (2–4) || Perez (36) || 36,102 || 85–58
|- style="text-align:center; style="background-color:#bbffbb;"
| 144 || September 14 || Mariners || 9–3 || Darvish (15–9) || Iwakuma (6–5) || || 45,075 || 86–58
|- style="text-align:center; style="background-color:#ffbbbb;"
| 145 || September 15 || Mariners || 8–6 || Luetge (2–1) || Scheppers (1–1) || Wilhelmsen (27) || 47,267 || 86–59
|- style="text-align:center; style="background-color:#bbffbb;"
| 146 || September 16 || Mariners || 2–1 || Harrison (17–9) || Beavan (9–10) || Uehara (1) || 45,928 || 87–59
|- style="text-align:center; style="background-color:#ffbbbb;"
| 147 || September 18 || @ Angels || 11–3 || Weaver (18–4) || Dempster (11–7) || || 36,948 || 87–60
|- style="text-align:center; style="background-color:#bbffbb;"
| 148 || September 19 || @ Angels || 6–2 || Holland (11–6) || Wilson (12–10) || || 37,093 || 88–60
|- style="text-align:center; style="background-color:#bbffbb;"
| 149 || September 20 || @ Angels || 3–1 || Darvish (16–9) || Frieri (4–2) || Nathan (34) || 38,205 || 89–60
|- style="text-align:center; style="background-color:#ffbbbb;"
| 150 || September 21 || @ Mariners || 6–3 || Iwakuma (7–5) || Pérez (1–2) || Wilhelmsen (28) || 17,893 || 89–61
|- style="text-align:center; style="background-color:#ffbbbb;"
| 151 || September 22 || @ Mariners || 1–0 || Beavan (10–10) || Harrison (17–10) || Wilhelmsen (29) || 17,671 || 89–62
|- style="text-align:center; style="background-color:#bbffbb;"
| 152 || September 23 || @ Mariners || 3–2 || Dempster (12–7) || Vargas (14–11) || Nathan (35) || 19,024 || 90–62
|- style="text-align:center; style="background-color:#bbffbb;"
| 153 || September 24 || Athletics || 5–4 || Nathan (3–4) || Ross (2–11) || || 43,044 || 91–62
|- style="text-align:center; style="background-color:#ffbbbb;"
| 154 || September 25 || Athletics || 3–2 (10) || Scribner (1–0) || Lowe (0–2) || Balfour (21) || 43,874 || 91–63
|- style="text-align:center; style="background-color:#ffbbbb;"
| 155 || September 26 || Athletics || 9–3 || Parker (12–8) || Pérez (1–3) || || 46,689 || 91–64
|- style="text-align:center; style="background-color:#bbffbb;"
| 156 || September 27 || Athletics || 9–7 || Harrison (18–10) || Blackley (5–4) || Nathan (36) || 43,796 || 92–64
|- style="text-align:center; style="background-color:#ffbbbb;"
| 157 || September 28 || Angels || 7–4 || Weaver (20–4) || Dempster (12–8) || Frieri (22) || 46,662 || 92–65
|- style="text-align:center; style="background-color:#bbbbbb;"
|  || September 29 || Angels || colspan=6| Postponed (rain); Makeup: September 30 as part of a doubleheader
|- style="text-align:center; style="background-color:#ffbbbb;"
| 158 || September 30 || Angels || 5–4 || Richards (4–3) ||Nathan (3–5) || Frieri (23) || 46,713 || 92–66
|- style="text-align:center; style="background-color:#bbffbb;"
| 159 || September 30 || Angels || 8–7 || Holland (12–6) || Santana (9–13) || Nathan (37) || 48,089 || 93–66
|- style="text-align:center; style="background-color:#ffbbbb;"
| 160 || October 1 || @ Athletics || 4–3 || Parker (13–8) || Pérez (1–4) || Balfour (23) || 21,162 || 93–67
|- style="text-align:center; style="background-color:#ffbbbb;"
| 161 || October 2 || @ Athletics || 3–1 || Blackley (6–4) || Harrison (18–11) || Balfour (24) || 30,660 || 93–68
|- style="text-align:center; style="background-color:#ffbbbb;"
| 162 || October 3 || @ Athletics || 12–5 || Scribner (2–0) || Holland (12–7) || || 36,067 || 93–69
|-

Postseason

Wild Card Game

Farm system

LEAGUE CHAMPIONS: AZL Rangers

References

External links
2012 Texas Rangers season at Baseball Reference

Texas Rangers seasons
Texas Rangers season
Range